Qutb ad-Din Muhammad (full name: Qutb ad-Dunya wa ad-Din Abul-Fath Muhammad Arslantegin ibn Anushtegin) was the first Shah of Khwarezm from 1097 to 1127. He was the son of Anushtegin Gharchai.

In around 1097, Qutb al-Din Muhammad was appointed governor of Khwarazm by the Seljuk sultan Berkyaruk's military commander, Habashi ibn Altun-Taq. Habashi had just put down a revolt by two Seljuk amirs, Qodun and Yaruq-Tash, who had killed the previous governor of Khwarazm, Ekinchi, and wanted to rule the province themselves. Qutb al-Din Muhammad therefore took control of Khwarazm and stopped an attempt by Ekinchi's son, Toghril-Tegin, to take control of the region.

During his lifetime, Qutb al-Din Muhammad remained loyal to the Seljuk ruler of Khurasan, Ahmad Sanjar. In 1113 or 1114 he helped a fellow Seljuk vassal, the Karakhanid Arslan Khan, stifle turmoil caused by the discontented religious classes in his realm. He also participated in Ahmad Sanjar's military campaign against the Great Seljuk Mahmud II, who ruled in western Iran and Iraq, in 1119.

Qutb al-Din Muhammad died in 1127 and was succeeded by his son Atsiz.

References
Boyle, J. A. . The Cambridge History of Iran Volume 5: The Saljuq and Mongol Periods. Cambridge, UK: Cambridge University Press, 1968.

1127 deaths
Khwarezmid rulers
Year of birth unknown
Anushtegin dynasty